The Swatch FIVB World Tour 2008 is an international beach volleyball competition.

The tour consists of 15 tournaments with both genders and 9 separate gender tournaments.

The top eight finishes that a team has from January 1, 2007 to July 20, 2008, on the Swatch FIVB World Tour (2007 and 2008), SWATCH FIVB World Championships (2007) and on FIVB recognised Continental Championship Finals, counts towards Olympic qualification for the Beijing 2008 Olympic Games. The top 24 teams of each gender will compete in the Beijing Games. There can be a maximum of two teams per country.

Grand Slam
There are six Grand Slam tournaments. These events give a higher number of points and more money than the rest of the tournaments.
Berlin, GermanySmart Grand Slam, June 10–15, 2008
Paris, FranceHenkel Grand Chelem, June 16–22, 2008
Stavanger, NorwayConocoPhillips Grand Slam Stavanger, June 24–29, 2008
Moscow, RussiaMoscow Grand Slam, July 1–6, 2008
Gstaad, Switzerland1 to 1 Energy Grand Slam 2008, July 22–27, 2008
Klagenfurt, AustriaA1 Beach Volleyball Grand Slam presented by Nokia, July 28 - August 2, 2008

Tournament results

Women

Men

Medal table by country

Awards

SWATCH Most Outstanding Player

Maria Antonelli (BRA) for the Otera Open Kristiansand in Kristiansand, Norway
Talita Antunes (BRA) for the China Shanghai Jinshan Open in Shanghai, China
Shelda Bede (BRA)
for the Mazury Open in Stare Jablonki, Poland
for the A1 Beach Volleyball Grand Slam presented by NOKIA in Klagenfurt, Austria
Nicole Branagh (USA) for the Hyundai Open Barcelona in Barcelona, Spain
Julius Brink (GER) for the Hyundai Open Barcelona in Barcelona, Spain
Ana Paula Connelly (BRA) for the 1 to 1 Energy Grand Slam 2008 in Gstaad, Switzerland
Pedro Cunha (BRA) for the Bahrain Open in Manama, Bahrain
Phil Dalhausser (USA)
for the ConocoPhillips Grand Slam Stavanger, in Stavanger, Norway
for the Moscow 2008 Grand Slam in Moscow, Russia
Juliana Felisberta (BRA)
for the Adelaide Australia Open in Adelaide, Australia
for the Keihan/Smfg Japan Open in Osaka, Japan
Larissa França (BRA) for the Brazil Open in Guarujá, Brazil
Pablo Herrera (ESP) for the Otera Open Kristiansand in Kristiansand, Norway
Igor Kolodinsky (RUS) for the A1 Beach Volleyball Grand Slam presented by NOKIA in Klagenfurt, Austria
Inocencio Lario (ESP) for the Mazury Open in Stare Jablonki, Poland
Fabio Luiz Magalhães (BRA) for the World Series 13 in Marseille, France
Harley Marques Silva (BRA)
for the Adelaide Australia Open in Adelaide, Australia
for the China Shanghai Jinshan Open in Shanghai, China
for the Italian Open presented by Abruzzo in Roseto degli Abruzzi, Italy
for the Brazil Open in Guarujá, Brazil
Misty May-Treanor (USA)
for the Smart Grand Slam in Berlin, Germany
for the Henkel Grand Chelem in Paris, France
for the ConocoPhillips Grand Slam Stavanger in Stavanger, Norway.
Reinder Nummerdor (NED) for the Dubai Open in Dubai, United Arab Emirates
Stephanie Pohl (GER) for the World Series 13 in Marseille, France
Emanuel Rego (BRA) for the Smart Grand Slam in Berlin, Germany
Todd Rogers (USA) for the Henkel Grand Chelem in Paris, France
Sean Rosenthal (USA) for the Prague Open in Prague, Czech Republic
April Ross (USA) for the Phuket Thailand Open in Phuket, Thailand
José Salema (ARG) for the Sanya Open in Sanya, China
Richard Schuil (NED) for the VIP Open in Zagreb, Croatia
Maria Clara Salgado (BRA) for the Myslowice Open in Myslowice, Poland
Pedro Solberg Salgado (BRA)
for the 1 to 1 Energy Grand Slam 2008 in Gstaad, Switzerland
for the Mallorca Open in Mallorca, Spain
Kerri Walsh (USA) for the Dubai Open in Dubai, United Arab Emirates
Zhang Xi (CHN)
for the Seoul Open in Seoul, South Korea
for the Moscow 2008 Grand Slam in Moscow, Russia
for the Sanya Open in Sanya, China

Records
The Russian player Igor Kolodinsky shot the fastest serve in the Swatch FIVB World Tour history, when he served at 114.0 km/h at the Italian Open presented by Abruzzo in Roseto degli Abruzzi, Italy.

American player Elaine Youngs, became the oldest women to win an "open" FIVB event, when she was 38 years, three months and 16 days old, when she won the Hyundai Open Barcelona in Barcelona, Spain.

References

Beachvolleyball-News: Beach World-Tour, volleyballer.de
Beach Volleyball Database

External links
2008 Swatch FIVB World Tour - tour calendar at FIVB.org
Beachvolley at Swatch.com

Tournaments
Adelaide Australia Open, March 25–30, 2008
Prague Open, May 6–11, 2008
Hyundai Open Barcelona, May 26 - June 1, 2008
Mazury Open, June 3–8, 2008
Henkel Grand chelem, June 16–22, 2008
ConocoPhillips Grand Slam Stavanger, June 24–29, 2008
1to1 energy Grand Slam 2008, July 21–27, 2008
Myslowice Open, September 2–7, 2008
Open de Mallorca, September 3–7, 2008

 

2008 in beach volleyball
2008